Hubert R. G. Schwyzer (March 16, 1935 - June 22, 2006) was an American philosopher and a professor of philosophy at the University of California, Santa Barbara. He was known for his research on Kantian philosophy.

Life
He was born in Vienna, Austria, on March 16, 1935, to Georg Clemens Schwyzer, a physician, and Elisabeth Schuh Schwyzer. The family was forced to leave Austria nine months after the annexation of Austria into Nazi Germany on 12 March 1938. Hubert grew up in England and attended a Jesuit boarding school before joining the Royal Air Force, where he served from 1953 to 1955. He received a degree in philosophy from Reading University in 1958. In 1959 he came to the United States for graduate study at the University of California at Berkeley and earned his doctorate in 1968. He taught at the University of Alberta for two years from 1963 to 1965, and then at University of California, Santa Barbara from 1965 until his retirement in 2002.

Family
He is the father of Hugo Schwyzer and Philip Schwyzer. His first wife, Alison Schwyzer was a professor of philosophy at Monterey Peninsula College.

Books
 The Unity of Understanding: A Study in Kantian Problems, Clarendon Press-Oxford 1990

References

20th-century American philosophers
Kant scholars
Philosophy academics
1935 births
2006 deaths
University of California, Santa Barbara faculty
University of California, Berkeley alumni